Helicina rostrata is a species of tropical land snail with an operculum, a terrestrial gastropod mollusk in the family Helicinidae.

This is an endangered species.

Distribution
This land snail is found in Guatemala and Nicaragua.

References

Helicinidae
Gastropods described in 1851
Taxonomy articles created by Polbot